Deodoro is a neighborhood of the West Zone of Rio de Janeiro, Brazil. Deodoro was one of four venue locations for the 2016 Summer Olympics, along with Barra da Tijuca, Copacabana, and Maracanã.

References

Neighbourhoods in Rio de Janeiro (city)